Alcala, officially the Municipality of Alcala,  is a 3rd class municipality in the province of Pangasinan, Philippines. According to the 2020 census, it has a population of 48,908 people.

History
What is known now as Alcala was formerly a barrio of Bayambang, formerly called "Dangla", a vernacular term referring to a medicinal shrub which grows abundantly in the place. As a barrio, it was subdivided into several smaller units called sitios, namely: Bugyao, Bacud, Cupi, Bitulao, Cabicalan, Patalan, Camanggaan and Sinabaan

On April 1, 1873, the settlers established a community. They submitted a petition calling for the cessation of Dangla into a separate township, but it took more than two years for the Spanish Authorities to take notice of the settlers' demands.

Finally, on September 20, 1875, a Royal Decree No. 682 was issued making the place an official municipality to be named Alcala, the name of a town in Spain where the then Governor of Pangasinan hailed from.

During the outbreak of the Philippine–American War, the place was the site of the field headquarters of General Malone of the United States Army.

When the Filipinos and Americans were fighting against the Japanese during World War II, the place was the site for the American Field Headquarters under the command of General Johnathan Wainwright. It is here that the first Guerrilla Combat Training School was established. The same school produced an Infantry Battalion composed mostly of Alcaleneans who played an important role in defending the whole of Northern Luzon from the superior Japanese Forces.

Geography
Alcala has a land area of 5,508 hectares.

Barangays
Alcala is politically subdivided into 21 barangays. These barangays are headed by elected officials: Barangay Captain, Barangay Council, whose members are called Barangay Councilors. All are elected every three years.

 Anulid
 Atainan
 Bersamin
 Canarvacanan
 Caranglaan
 Curareng
 Gualsic
 Kisikis
 Laoac
 Macayo
 Pindangan Centro
 Pindangan East
 Pindangan West
 Poblacion East
 Poblacion West
 San Juan
 San Nicolas
 San Pedro Apartado
 San Pedro Ili
 San Vicente
 Vacante

Climate

Demographics

Economy

Government
Alcala, belonging to the fifth congressional district of the province of Pangasinan, is governed by a mayor designated as its local chief executive and by a municipal council as its legislative body in accordance with the Local Government Code. The mayor, vice mayor, and the councilors are elected directly by the people through an election which is being held every three years.

Elected officials

Tourism
A tilapia dispersal and barbecue are part of the attractions in Alcala.

The 2012 Red Bikini Open was held in San Juan.

Alcala celebrated the founding anniversary and annual Tukar Festival (Music Festival) every September 20

Alcala celebrated their fiesta on May 1–3

San Vicente, Alcala has its Backpack Project.

Holy Cross Parish Church

The 1881 Holy Cross Parish Church is a Vicariate of Sacred Heart. Its Feast Day are May 3 is the Feast of the Finding of the True Cross and September 14 is the Feast of the Exaltation of the Holy Cross, with the present Parish Priest, Rev. Fr. Hurley John S. Solfelix) under the jurisdiction of the Roman Catholic Diocese of Urdaneta.

The January 4, 1881 Spanish Royal Decree of the Spanish Government created the Parish of the Holy Cross and accepted by the Dominicans (House of the Order) on November of 188. Padre Eduardo Saamaniego, O.P., was appointed first parish priest on February 21, 1882. The convent was erected under Fr. Revilla and Fr. Casamitjana but the same was destroyed.

In 1950, Padre Jose V. Ferrer caused the destruction of the old church and instead built a semi-concrete edifice. Aided by Bishop Jesus Sison and Archbishop Mariano Madriaga, the Priest founded the Holy Rood Academy. Fr. Amado Lopez continued the rehabilitation of the Church and school but the 1967 and 1968 Casiguran earthquake annihilated the Church. Thus, Fr. Eusebio Vigilia and Fr. Johnny Tagalicud (1972-1977) rehabilitated the present new Church. (Source, 2007 Fiesta Yearbook of Bani, Pangasinan Church).

Education

Elementary schools

 Alcala Central School
 South Central School
 Anulid Elem. School
 Atainan Elem. School
 Bersamin Elem. School
 Gualsic Elem. School
 Guinawedan Elem. School
 Laoac Elem. School
 Macayo Integrated School
 Pindangan West Elem. School
 Pindangan East Elem. School
 San Juan Elem. School
 San Pedro Apartado Elem. School
 San Pedro Ili Elem. School
 San Vicente Elem. School
 Vacante Elem. School

Secondary schools
 Cipriano P. Primicias National High School
 Arboleda National High School
 Pindangan National High School
 Canarvacanan National High School
 San Pedro Apartado National High School
 Bersamin Agro-Industrial High School
 Macayo Integrated School

Private schools
 Holy Rood Academy
 Our Lady of Peace Academy
 Alcala Brookside School Inc.
 Alcala Christian Academy
 God's Favor Learning Center Inc.

Gallery

References

External links

 Alcala Profile at PhilAtlas.com
 Municipal Profile at the National Competitiveness Council of the Philippines
 Alcala at the Pangasinan Government Website
 Alcala Page
 Local Governance Performance Management System
 [ Philippine Standard Geographic Code]
 Philippine Census Information

Municipalities of Pangasinan
Populated places on the Agno River